George Joseph Olakkengil is an Indian composer, programmer and music producer who primarily works in Hindi films. He started his career with associated acts with film composer Ram Sampath, who also lived in the same Chembur neighborhood, as music programmer and producer. Joseph has collaborated with several music directors including the likes of composer duo Salim–Sulaiman, Shantanu Moitra, Raju Singh, Clinton Cerejo, Lesle Lewis (composer) and Ranjit Barot. He made his debut as a score composer in 2012 and went on to program/ produce background score for several Bollywood Hindi, Marathi, Punjabi, Telugu, Malayalam, Bengali, and English-language films. Joseph worked on the trailer and produced the musical theme for the American mystery thriller Broken Horses in 2015.

Early life and education
Born to Joseph Olakkengil an educator and Thressiama John a banker; George Joseph spent his childhood in Pavaratty, near Guruvayoor, in the Thrissur district of Kerala. His early interest in music started from playing guitar and violin. On a later stage Joseph started experimenting with key board which was instrumental in pursuing music career. After completing schooling in Thrissur; in 1995–96 Joseph joined School of Engineering, CUSAT at CUSAT campus in Kochi for Bachelor of Technology in Mechanical engineering, which he completed in the year 2000. In the same year he joined SAE Institute Chennai to pursue his interest in music.

Career
In 2003; after completing sound engineering course from the SAE Institute at Chennai, Joseph relocated to Chembur, Mumbai to pursue a career in film music. Initially George worked as sound engineer to composers and started freelancing works with Ram Sampath, Shantanu Moitra and Raju Singh.

Film discography

As a Music Programmer / Producer (for other composers)

As a Background Score Composer

Television discography

As a Music Composer / Programmer / Producer

Short Film discography

As a Music Composer / Programmer / Producer

References

External links 
 
 George Joseph on YouTube

Indian male musicians
Hindi film score composers
Indian music arrangers
Musicians from Mumbai
Film musicians from Kerala
Musicians from Thrissur
21st-century Indian composers
Living people
1978 births
Indian male film score composers
21st-century male musicians